Ritchie County is a county in the U.S. state of West Virginia. As of the 2020 census, the population was 8,444. Its county seat is Harrisville. The county was created in 1843 by the Virginia General Assembly and named for Richmond newspaper publisher Thomas Ritchie.

History
Ritchie was one of fifty Virginia counties that were admitted to the Union as the state of West Virginia on June 20, 1863, at the height of the Civil War.  Later that year, the new state's counties were divided into civil townships, with the intention of encouraging local government.  This proved impractical in the heavily rural state, and in 1872 the townships were converted into magisterial districts.  Ritchie County was divided into four districts: Clay, Grant, Murphy, and Union.

In 1911, historian Minnie Kendall Lowther published "The History of Ritchie County." Her book is still regarded as one of the most comprehensive histories of any county in West Virginia.

Geography

Major highways
 U.S. Route 50
 West Virginia Route 16
 West Virginia Route 31
 West Virginia Route 47
 West Virginia Route 74

Adjacent counties
Pleasants County (north)
Tyler County (northeast)
Doddridge County (east)
Gilmer County (southeast)
Calhoun County (south)
Wirt County (west)
Wood County (northwest)

Demographics

2000 census
As of the census of 2000, there were 10,343 people, 4,184 households, and 2,999 families living in the county.  The population density was 23 people per square mile (9/km2).  There were 5,513 housing units at an average density of 12 per square mile (5/km2).  The racial makeup of the county was 98.68% White, 0.14% Black or African American, 0.27% Native American, 0.13% Asian, 0.11% from other races, and 0.69% from two or more races.  0.47% of the population were Hispanic or Latino of any race.

There were 4,184 households, out of which 30.20% had children under the age of 18 living with them, 58.20% were married couples living together, 9.70% had a female householder with no husband present, and 28.30% were non-families. 25.00% of all households were made up of individuals, and 12.30% had someone living alone who was 65 years of age or older.  The average household size was 2.45 and the average family size was 2.91.

In the county, the population was spread out, with 23.00% under the age of 18, 7.70% from 18 to 24, 28.00% from 25 to 44, 26.10% from 45 to 64, and 15.20% who were 65 years of age or older.  The median age was 40 years. For every 100 females there were 96.20 males.  For every 100 females age 18 and over, there were 95.10 males.

The median income for a household in the county was $27,332, and the median income for a family was $34,809. Males had a median income of $28,147 versus $18,149 for females. The per capita income for the county was $15,175.  About 14.30% of families and 19.10% of the population were below the poverty line, including 23.60% of those under age 18 and 14.10% of those age 65 or over.

2010 census
As of the 2010 United States census, there were 10,449 people, 4,367 households, and 2,960 families living in the county. The racial makeup of the county was 98.7% white, 0.2% black or African American, 0.1% Asian, 0.1% American Indian, 0.2% from other races, and 0.8% from two or more races. Those of Hispanic or Latino origin made up 0.5% of the population. In terms of ancestry, 20.3% were German, 14.6% were Irish, 13.2% were American, and 11.3% were English.

Of the 4,367 households, 28.2% had children under the age of 18 living with them, 53.2% were married couples living together, 9.8% had a female householder with no husband present, 32.2% were non-families, and 28.2% of all households were made up of individuals. The average household size was 2.37 and the average family size was 2.85. The median age was 44.3 years.

The median income for a household in the county was $32,619 and the median income for a family was $39,919. Males had a median income of $31,807 versus $23,966 for females. The per capita income for the county was $18,255. About 13.9% of families and 18.9% of the population were below the poverty line, including 21.6% of those under age 18 and 15.2% of those age 65 or over.

Politics
After having leaned strongly towards the Democratic Party between the New Deal and Bill Clinton's presidency, most of West Virginia has since 2000 seen an extremely rapid swing towards the Republican Party due to declining unionization along with views on environmental, social and cultural issues increasingly at odds with the national Democratic party. In contrast, Ritchie County along with neighbouring Doddridge County and Tyler County were historically powerfully Unionist and have always been solidly Republican since the Civil War. Only one Democratic presidential nominee has carried Ritchie County since West Virginia's statehood: Woodrow Wilson in 1912, and he won by a mere six votes with only 34.22 percent of all votes against a Republican Party mortally divided between conservative incumbent Taft and progressive Theodore Roosevelt.

Notable sights
 Historic Berdine's Five and Dime
North Bend State Park
North Bend Rail Trail
 The Double Scoop Ice Cream Parlor Cairo, WV
Pine Hill Pottery
Sunny Hollow Farms
Old Stone House Museum

Communities

City
Pennsboro

Towns
Auburn
Cairo
Ellenboro
Harrisville (county seat)
Pullman

Magisterial districts
Clay
Grant
Murphy
Union

Unincorporated communities
Berea
Brohard
Burnt House
Fonzo
Macfarlan
Petroleum
Smithville

26362 263 country code they live 26362 John Stockton's birthday

Notes

References

 
1843 establishments in Virginia
Populated places established in 1843
Northwestern Turnpike
Counties of Appalachia